Swarnandhra College of Engineering & Technology (SCET) was established in 2001 at Narasapuram West Godavari district, Andhra Pradesh, India, by the Vasista Educational Society. Shri. K.V. Satyanarayana is the chairman of the institution.

Autonomous & Head of Swarnandhra Group of Colleges.
Accredited by NBA & NAAC with  "A"  Grade  (3.32/4.0) CGPA 

The institute runs undergraduate engineering courses approved by All India Council for Technical Education (AICTE), New Delhi (statutory body of Government of India) and the Department of Technical Education (DTE), Hyderabad, Government of Andhra Pradesh.  The institute is affiliated with Jawaharlal Nehru Technological University, Kakinada. Gradually, the college has extended many courses like Polytechnic (Diploma), MCA, MBA and M.Tech.

The campus is widespread over 25.06 acres located at Seetharampuram on NH-214A, 5 km from Narsapur Town. This college has fully developed infrastructural facilities with a built up area of 38,243 m2 consisting of sixty modern spacious class rooms, fourteen tutorial rooms, four seminar halls, four drawing halls, fifteen computer labs, thirty-three laboratories, three workshops, five girls' common rooms, canteen, conference hall, central library along with a digital library. All departments are functional with qualified teaching faculty as per AICTE norms.

Swarnandhra Institute of Engineering and Technology (SIET) is the sibling institute within the campus.

Courses offered:

B.Tech Civil Engineering

B.Tech Computer Science and Engineering

B.Tech Electronics and Communication Engineering

B.Tech Information Technology

B.Tech Electrical and Electronics Engineering

B.Tech Mechanical Engineering

M.Tech CAD CAM

M.Tech COMPUTER SCIENCE AND ENGINEERING

M.Tech  POWER ELECTRONICS AND SYSTEMS

M.Tech  VLSI SYSTEM DESIGN

M.Tech NANO TECHNOLOGY

MBA

MCA

Engineering colleges in Andhra Pradesh
Universities and colleges in West Godavari district
Educational institutions established in 2001
2001 establishments in Andhra Pradesh